Bigger Township is one of eleven townships in Jennings County, Indiana, United States. As of the 2010 census, its population was 726 and it contained 298 housing units.

History
Bigger Township was established in 1840. It was named for Samuel Bigger, seventh Governor of Indiana.

Benville Bridge was listed on the National Register of Historic Places in 1996.

Geography

Unincorporated towns
 San Jacinto

Adjacent townships
 Campbell Township (north)
 Shelby Township, Ripley County (east)
 Monroe Township, Jefferson County (southeast)
 Lancaster Township, Jefferson County (south)
 Lovett Township (west)
 Vernon Township (west)

Cemeteries
The township contains three cemeteries: Bethel, Callicotte and Hughes.

Airports and landing strips
 Broomsage Ranch Airport

References
 
 United States Census Bureau cartographic boundary files

External links

Townships in Jennings County, Indiana
Townships in Indiana